Joel Paul Antonio Taylor (born 24 March 1996) is an English footballer who plays as a left back for Wealdstone in the National League

Career

Stoke City
Taylor began his career at Stoke City where he progressed through their Academy and signed a professional contract in 2014. Taylor joined League One side Rochdale on loan in January 2017. He made his Football League debut on 4 February 2017 against Bristol Rovers. He was released by Stoke at the end of the 2016–17 season.

Kidderminster
Taylor joined Kidderminster Harriers in June 2017. On 4 December 2018, Taylor was loaned out to Halesowen Town until 5 January 2019. The deal was later extended for one month further. He returned to Kidderminster on 8 February 2019.

Chester
On 21 May 2019, Chester confirmed the signing of Taylor on a one-year deal.

Chesterfield
On 8 December 2020, Taylor joined Chesterfield for an undisclosed fee. He made his debut later that day,  in a 1–0 victory over Sutton United.

Notts County
On 13 July 2021, Taylor joined Chesterfield's rivals Notts County on a two-year deal, signing for an undisclosed fee.

On 12 November 2022, Taylor joined Dagenham & Redbridge on a two-month loan deal.

On 13 March 2023, Taylor departed Notts County after his contract was terminated by mutual consent.

Wealdstone 
The day after his release from Notts County, Taylor joined National League play-off hopefuls Wealdstone.

Career statistics

References

External links

1996 births
Living people
English footballers
English Football League players
National League (English football) players
Southern Football League players
Stoke City F.C. players
Rochdale A.F.C. players
Kidderminster Harriers F.C. players
Chester F.C. players
Chesterfield F.C. players
Notts County F.C. players
Dagenham & Redbridge F.C. players
Wealdstone F.C. players
Association football fullbacks